Bernhard von Gaza (6 May 1881 – 25 September 1917) was a German rower who competed in the 1908 Summer Olympics. He won a bronze medal in single sculls.

Barnhard was killed during the Battle of Menin Road Ridge of World War I. On 23 September 1917 he was wounded while leading an attack to recapture the 'Winterstellung' (Eagle Trench, Eagle House, Louis Farm), just east of Langemark. Barnhard was taken prisoner of war and transported to Dozinghem Casualty Clearing Station where he succumbed to his wounds. He is buried at Dozinghem Military Cemetery, plot XVI, row B, grave 6.

See also
 List of Olympians killed in World War I

References

External links
profile

1881 births
1917 deaths
Olympic rowers of Germany
Rowers at the 1908 Summer Olympics
Olympic bronze medalists for Germany
Olympic medalists in rowing
German male rowers
German military personnel killed in World War I
Medalists at the 1908 Summer Olympics
European Rowing Championships medalists